Julie Cruikshank is a Canadian anthropologist known for her research collaboration with Indigenous peoples of the Yukon. She is a Professor Emerita in the Department of Anthropology at the University of British Columbia. She has lived and worked for over a decade in the Yukon Territory, creating an oral history of the region, through her work with people including Angela Sidney, Kitty Smith, and Annie Ned. Her work focuses mainly on the practical and theoretical developments in oral tradition studies.

Awards and achievements 
In 2012, Cruikshank was appointed an Officer to the Order of Canada. In 2010, she became a fellow in the Royal Society of Canada, the Academies of Arts, Humanities, and Sciences of Canada.

In 2006, Cruikshank's book from the University of Washington press, Do Glaciers Listen? Local Knowledge, Colonial Encounters, and Social Imagination, won the Julian Steward Award from the Anthropology and Environmental Society, which is a section of the American Anthropological Association. The book also won the Victor Turner Prize for Ethnographic Writing in 2006.

In 1995, Cruikshank was awarded the Robert F. Heizer Prize by the American Society for Ethnohistory as well as a UBC prize Prize for Excellence in Teaching from the Faculty of Arts. In 1992, she was awarded the UBC Killam Research Prize and two years later in 1994, received the UBC Izaak Walton Killam Memorial Faculty Research Fellowship.

Publications

Books

Edited volumes
 2007. My Old People’s Stories: A Legacy for Yukon First Nations, by Catharine McClellan. 3 volumes. Occasional Paper in Yukon History, 5(1-3), 804 pages.
 Changing Traditions in Northern Ethnography

References

External links
 Faculty website

Living people
Officers of the Order of Canada
Fellows of the Royal Society of Canada
Academic staff of the University of British Columbia
Canadian women social scientists
Canadian women anthropologists
21st-century Canadian women scientists
Canadian anthropologists
21st-century Canadian women writers
20th-century Canadian women writers
1950 births